Chahak (also Romanized as Chāhak) is a village in Pain Velayat Rural District, Razaviyeh District, Mashhad County, Razavi Khorasan Province, Iran. At the 2006 census, its population was 671, in 178 families.

References 

Populated places in Mashhad County